Mario Braga Gadelha (born 24 April 1934), commonly known as Babá, was a Brazilian former footballer who played for Ceará, Flamengo and UNAM.

Career
Babá started his professional career in 1952 at the age of sixteen with Ceará. He was later sold in 1953 to Flamengo. He played 308 games and scored 89 goals with Flamengo from 1953 until 1962, when he was sold to Mexican Club Universidad Nacional. In 1958 he was called to the Brazil national football team for a friendly match against Yugoslavia.

He played with UNAM from 1962, in the club's first season at the Primera División, Mexican football top-flight, to 1967.

After his spell in Mexican football, Babá came back to Brazil where he played for one season with Ceará.

Babá died on 8 April 2010.

References

External links

1934 births
CR Flamengo footballers
Ceará Sporting Club players
Club Universidad Nacional footballers
Brazilian footballers
Association football forwards
Brazil international footballers
Brazilian expatriate footballers
Expatriate footballers in Mexico
Brazilian expatriate sportspeople in Mexico
2010 deaths
Sportspeople from Ceará